The number of women sitting in the House of Commons increased to six during the 26th Canadian Parliament; the number of women senators remained at six. 40 women ran for seats in the Canadian House of Commons in the 1963 federal election; two women out of five incumbents were reelected. Ellen Fairclough, Isabel Hardie and Margaret Mary Macdonald were defeated when they ran for reelection. Pauline Jewett  and Margaret Konantz were elected to the House of Commons in the general election; Eloise Jones and Margaret Rideout were elected in by-elections held in June 1964.

Judy LaMarsh was named to the Canadian cabinet, becoming the second woman to serve as a federal cabinet minister.

Nancy Hodges resigned her seat in the Senate in June 1965, reducing the number of women senators to five.

Party Standings

Members of the House of Commons

Senators

References 

Lists of women politicians in Canada